This is a list of games released for the Windows Mobile Professional operating system (formerly known as Pocket PC).

0-9
 Constructo Combat - Concrete Software, Inc. (2006)
 Lawn Darts - Concrete Software, Inc. (2007)
 "4Pinball" - Limelight Software Limited

A
 Aces Texas Hold'em - No Limit - Concrete Software, Inc. (2004)
 Aces Texas Hold'em - Limit - Concrete Software, Inc. (2004)
 Aces Omaha - Concrete Software, Inc. (2005)
 Aces Blackjack - Concrete Software, Inc. (2006)
 Aces Tournament Timer - Concrete Software, Inc. (2006)
 Add-Venture - Qsoftz (2006)
 Atomic Battle Dragons - Isotope 244 (2006)
 Age of Empires Gold edition - Microsoft, ZIO Interactive
 Age of Empires III - Microsoft, Glu Mobile

B
 Baccarat - Midas Interactive Entertainment (2003)
 Bass Guitar Hero - www.iPocketPC.net (2009)
 Batty - Applian Technologies (1999)
 Bejeweled 2 - Astraware (2006) - Also known as Diamond Mine 2
 Bingo - Midas Interactive Entertainment (2003)
 Blackjack - Midas Interactive Entertainment (2003)
 Blaster - Fognog (1999)
 Break My Bricks - www.iPocketPC.net (2009)
 Burning Sand 2 -  (2009)
 Blade of Betrayal - HPT Interactive (2003)

C
 Call of Duty 2 - Mforma (2006)
 Call of Duty 2 Pocket PC Edition - Aspyr (2007)
 Caribbean Poker - Midas Interactive Entertainment (2003)
 Craps - Midas Interactive Entertainment (2003)
 Cubis - Astraware (2003)

D
 Diamond Mine - Astraware (2002)
 Domination - Smart-Thinker
 Dopewars - Jennifer Glover (2000)
 Dragon Bane II - Mythological Software (2003)
 Drum Kit Ace - Momentum Games (2006)

Dragon Bird

F
 Fade - Fade Team
 Fish Tycoon - Last Day of Work (2004)
 Fruit Bomb - Momentum Games (2004)

G
 Glyph - Astraware (2006)
 Gold Mine - Momentum Games (2004)
 Guitar Hero III Mobile - Glu Mobile (2009)

H
 Hoyle Puzzle & Board Games 2005 - VU Games (2004)
 "Harry Putter's Crazy Golf" - Limelight Software

I
 Insaniquarium - Astraware (2003)
 Intelli Cube - Midas Interactive Entertainment (2003)
 Interstellar Flames - XEN Games

J
 Jawbreaker - Oopdreams Software, Inc. (2003)

K
 K-Rally - Infinite Dreams Inc.
 "JIGaSAWrus" - Limelight Software

L
 Lemonade Inc. (aka Lemonade Tycoon) - Hexacto Games (2002)
 Leo's Flight Simulator Leo's Space Combat SimulatorM
 Madden NFL 2005 - Mobile Digital Media (2005)
 Metalion - ZIO Interactive (2001)
 Metalion 2 - ZIO Interactive (2003)
 Microsoft Entertainment Pack 2004 - Microsoft Game Studios (2004)
 Monopoly - Infogrames (2002)
 Multi Machine - Midas Interactive Entertainment (2003)
 My Little Tank - Astraware (2005)
 Mystery of the Pharaoh - Midas Interactive Entertainment (2003)
 "Marble Worlds" 2 - Limelight Software

Q
 Quake - Pulse Interactive, Inc (2004)
 Quake III Arena - noctemware (2005)
 The Quest (2006)

P
 PBA Bowling - Concrete Software, Inc. (2008)
 Plant Tycoon - Last Day of Work (2004)
 Pocket Humanity - Alexis Laferriere (2005)
 Pocket UFO - SMK Software (2006)
 Pocket Mini Golf - Momentum Games (2003)
 Pocket Mini Golf 2 - Momentum Games (2005)
 Pop Drop - Momentum Games (2005)
 PT CatchFish - PlayfulTurtle.com (2007)
 PT PuzzleChase - PlayfulTurtle.com (2008)

R
 Reversi - Midas Interactive Entertainment (2003)
 Roulette - Midas Interactive Entertainment (2003)
 RocketElite - Digital Concepts
 Royal 21 - Fury Ultd. (2009)
 "Red Sector 2112" - Limelight Software

S
 Seven Seas - Astraware (2003)
 Scrabble - Handmark (2006)
 Shadow of Legend - SmartCell Technology, LLC (2007–2008, no longer available now) - 2D Fantasy MMORPG game.
 SimCity 2000 - ZIO Interactive (1999) - A port of the popular SimCity 2000 game.
 Sink My Ships - www.iPocketPC.net (2009) - An awesome clone of Battleship.
 Slot Machine - Midas Interactive Entertainment (2003)
 Snails - Futech Ltd.
 Sokoban - XComsoft Ltd
 Solitaire
 Spb Brain Evolution - SPB Software (2007)
 Spb AirIslands - SPB Software (2006)
 StarPop - Astraware (2006)
 Strategic Assault - XEN Games (1998)
 Sudoku - Diladele (2006)
 Super Elemental

T
 TextTwist - Astraware
 Tic Tac Toe - www.iPocketPC.net (2009)
 Tomb Raider - Eidos Interactive (2002)
 Tower of Hanoi - Midas Interactive Entertainment (2003)
 Tony Hawk's Pro Skater 2 - Activision
 Tradewinds - Astraware
 Turjah - Jimmy Software
 Turjah 2 - Jimmy Software (2002)
 Tripeaks Solitaire - Diladele (2006)

U
 Ultima Underworld - ZIO Interactive
 UNO - Concrete Software, Inc. (2007)
 UNO Free Fall - Concrete Software, Inc. (2007)

V
 Video Poker - Midas Interactive Entertainment (1999)

W
 Warfare Incorporated - Spiffcode
 Worms World Party - Team17 (2001)
 "WordPlay - Limelight Software

X
 Xwords - Open Source word game
 X Ranger

Z
 Zuma - PopCap

References

External links
 GameFAQs List of Pocket PC Games

Video game lists by platform
Personal digital assistant software